Caan (als: Caan van Neck and De la Bassecour Caan) was the name of a Dutch patrician family.

History 
The oldest known family member Heynderick Thielemans (Caen), a baker in Delfshaven who died in 1644.

Bibliography 
Nederland's Patriciaat 16 (1926), p. 37-45.

Dutch patrician families